Conejos is an unincorporated town, a post office, a census-designated place (CDP), and the county seat of Conejos County, Colorado, United States. The Conejos post office has the ZIP Code 81129. At the United States Census 2010, the population of the Conejos CDP was 58, while the population of the 81129 ZIP Code Tabulation Area was 156 including adjacent areas. Conejos is the only unincorporated county seat in the State of Colorado.

History

Conejos is a historic Hispanic settlement. Both the settlement and the county were initially named "Guadalupe". A major historical and architectural feature of Conejos is the Our Lady of Guadalupe Catholic Church, founded in 1858. The church was the first Roman Catholic parish in modern-day Colorado and was constructed by Spanish colonists from New Mexico.

The Conejos post office has been in operation since 1862.

Geography
Conejos is located in southeastern Conejos County in the San Luis Valley. It is bordered to the south by the town of Antonito. U.S. Route 285 forms the eastern edge of the community and leads north  to Alamosa, Colorado, and south  to Tres Piedras, New Mexico.

Demographics

See also

Outline of Colorado
Index of Colorado-related articles
State of Colorado
Colorado cities and towns
Colorado census designated places
Colorado counties
Conejos County, Colorado

References

External links

Conejos @ Colorado.com
Conejos @ UncoverColorado.com
Conejos County website

County seats in Colorado
Census-designated places in Conejos County, Colorado
Census-designated places in Colorado
Hispanic and Latino American history
1858 establishments in New Mexico Territory